Dave Scatchard (born February 20, 1976) is a Canadian retired professional ice hockey centre. He played in the National Hockey League (NHL) with the Vancouver Canucks, New York Islanders, Boston Bruins, Phoenix Coyotes, Nashville Predators, and St. Louis Blues. On August 22, 2011, he announced his retirement on Twitter, stating that doctors told him it would not be safe for him to continue to play hockey due to concussion-related injuries. Scatchard was born in Hinton, Alberta, but grew up in Salmon Arm, British Columbia.

Playing career
Scatchard played as a junior for the Portland Winter Hawks of the Western Hockey League (WHL). The Vancouver Canucks selected him 42nd overall in the 1994 NHL Entry Draft.  He spent his first year as a professional in the American Hockey League (AHL) with the Syracuse Crunch, Vancouver's minor league affiliate. Scatchard made his NHL debut in the 1997–98 season, registering 24 points and establishing himself as a two-way forward.  On December 19, 1999, during his third season in Vancouver, the Canucks traded Scatchard to the New York Islanders along with forward Bill Muckalt and goaltender Kevin Weekes for goaltender Felix Potvin. Scatchard played four and a half seasons with the Islanders, recording two career-high 45-point campaigns in 2000–01 and 2002–03.  Following the 2004–05 NHL lockout, Scatchard signed with the Boston Bruins, but after just 16 games, he was traded to the Phoenix Coyotes for defenceman David Tanabe on November 18, 2005.  In 2006–07, Scatchard was sidelined for the last 32 games of the season with a concussion, finishing with eight points in 45 games.  The Coyotes bought him out of the final two years of his contract in the off-season.

On November 15, 2007, Scatchard signed a professional try-out with the Milwaukee Admirals of the AHL, the top minor league affiliate of the Nashville Predators. He was released after eight games.

Scatchard subsequently took time off due to lingering concussion problems.  Prior to the 2009–10 season, he was invited to the Vancouver Canucks' training camp  but was released before the end of the pre-season. Shortly after the regular season began, he signed a one-year deal to return with the Predators organization.

On August 3, 2010, Scatchard, once again a free agent, signed a one-year contract with the St. Louis Blues.

Career statistics

References

External links

1976 births
Living people
Boston Bruins players
Canadian ice hockey centres
Hartford Wolf Pack players
Ice hockey people from Alberta
Ice hockey people from British Columbia
Milwaukee Admirals players
Nashville Predators players
New York Islanders players
People from Salmon Arm
People from Yellowhead County
Peoria Rivermen (AHL) players
Phoenix Coyotes players
Portland Winterhawks players
St. Louis Blues players
Syracuse Crunch players
Vancouver Canucks draft picks
Vancouver Canucks players